Marie Alvarado-Gil is an American politician who represents California's 4th State Senate district in the California State Senate following her election in the 2022 California State Senate election. She is a member of the Democratic Party.

Education
Alvarado-Gil attended UC Davis, studying Animal Science. In her third year at school, she got pregnant, and consequently decided to drop out of school. She later went to University of San Francisco where she obtained both a Bachelor and a Master of Public Administration.

Political career
Alvarado-Gil ran as a Democrat for California's 4th State Senate district in the 2022 California State Senate election. She placed second in the top-two primary, with fellow Democrat Tim Robertson placing first. This guaranteed that the district, which is largely rural and tends to lean Republican, would be represented by a Democrat.

Electoral history

References

External links 
 Government website
 Campaign website

21st-century American politicians
21st-century American women politicians
Democratic Party California state senators
California Democrats
Hispanic and Latino American state legislators in California
Hispanic and Latino American women in politics
Living people
Year of birth missing (living people)